Serie A1 is the premier futsal league in Italy.  It was founded in 1984.  The league, which is played under UEFA rules, currently consists of 16 teams. It is organized by Divisione Calcio a 5.

Champions

Performance by club

External links
Official Site  Divisione C/5
www.daysport.com
www.Calcioa5point.it
www.ilcalcioa5.com
http://www.futsalplanet.com

 
Futsal competitions in Italy
futsal
Italy
1983 establishments in Italy
Sports leagues established in 1983